The 1933–34 Gauliga Bayern was the inaugural season of the league, one of the 16 Gauligas in Germany at the time. It was the first tier of the football league system in Bavaria (German:Bayern) from 1933 to 1945. The Gauliga Bayern had replaced the Bezirksliga Bayern which had been played in two divisions, north and south, as the top tier of football in Bavaria at the end of the 1932–33 seasons.

The Gauligas in Germany replaced the seven regional championships and a large number of local leagues that existed in Germany until then and were established after the rise of the Nazis to power in 1933.

The league champions 1. FC Nürnberg qualified for the 1934 German football championship, where it finished first in its group with Dresdner SC, Borussia Fulda and Wacker Halle and qualified for the semi-finals. After defeating Viktoria 89 Berlin 2–1 Nürnberg advanced to the final where it lost 2–1 to FC Schalke 04. For 1. FC Nürnberg it was the seventh time the club reached the final and the first time it lost, having won five national championships from 1920 to 1927 and also participated in the inconclusive 1922 final. For Nürnberg it was the first of seven Gauliga championships the club would win in the era from 1933 to 1944.

After attempts to establish professionalism in German football in 1932 the rise of the Nazis to power put a sudden end to this, forcing all football leagues in Germany, including the Gauligas, to remain strictly amateur. The new political situation in Germany at the time of the introduction of the Gauligas, the Nazis having come to power, also meant that Jewish players and officials were no longer permitted to take part in German sport clubs. For Gauliga clubs like FC Bayern Munich, taunted as Judenklub, this meant it lost important figures that had built the club up to win its first German championship in 1932. After president Kurt Landauer and coach Richard Dombi had to leave the club because of their Jewish background, the club declined.

Table
The 1933–34 season was the inaugural season of the league with all clubs coming from the two regional divisions of the Bezirksliga Bayern.

References

Sources

External links
 Das Deutsche Fussball Archiv  Historic German league tables

1933-34
1